Kalungu may refer to:

Kalungu, Democratic Republic of the Congo
Kalungu, Uganda
Kalungu District, Uganda